Costantino Cristiano Luna Pianegonda (10 December 1910, Recoaro Terme, Italy - 29 August 1997, Zacapa) was an Italian Franciscan friar and clergyman. He was ordained priest by the Franciscans on 1 July 1934 before being appointed first bishop of Zacapa in the Archdiocese of Guatemala on 30 November 1955. He was enthroned on 6 January 1956 by archbishop Gennaro Verolino, then apostolic nuncio in Guatemala. He resigned on 16 February 1980 and remained a bishop emeritus of the diocese until his death.

References

Sources
 

1910 births
1997 deaths
Italian Franciscans
20th-century Italian Roman Catholic bishops
People from the Province of Vicenza
Roman Catholic bishops of Zacapa y Santo Cristo de Esquipulas